The 2009 Texas A&M Aggies women's soccer team represented Texas A&M University in the 2009 NCAA Division I women's college soccer season. The Aggies were led by G. Guerrieri, who has coached the team since the program's inception in 1993 (17 years).

The Aggies finished the season 15–7–3 and advanced to the Sweet 16 of the 2009 NCAA tournament before falling to Florida State 2–1 in 2OT in Tallahassee, FL.

The 2009 team had 28 roster players, with 14 scholarships to utilize between them.

Schedule/Results

Lineup/Formation
4–3–3 was utilized for most of the season
Mouseover names for stats

Roster/Statistics
Starters highlighted in green

Season Review

Non-Conference
Coming Soon

Conference
Coming Soon

NCAA tournament
Coming Soon

Accolades/Notes
 Texas A&M made its 15th straight NCAA tournament appearance.
 Texas A&M finished #23 in the RPI and was not awarded a seed for the first time since 1998.
 2009 was the first time in program history the Aggies started the NCAA tournament on the road.
 Texas A&M reached at least the Sweet 16 round of the NCAA tournament for the 9th time.
 Texas A&M finished the season ranked #13, the 14th time in 15 years the program has finished ranked in the Top 15.
 Defender Emily Peterson won the prestigious Lowe’s Senior CLASS Award.
 Texas A&M averaged 3,211 fans per game at the Aggie Soccer Stadium, its 3rd highest in school history.

References

External links

Official website

Texas A&M Aggies women's soccer seasons
Texas AandM